"No Matter What" is a song originally recorded by Badfinger for their album No Dice in 1970, written and sung by Pete Ham and produced by Mal Evans.

Recording
As a demo, "No Matter What" was originally recorded at a slower tempo by Ham on acoustic guitar (as heard on the posthumous Ham solo CD 7 Park Avenue). A group demo version, played at the same tempo as Ham's acoustic demo, was recorded by Badfinger on April 18, 1970  with Mal Evans producing. The song was recorded again in a rockier fashion, at a faster tempo, by the band in May 1970 at Abbey Road Studios and it was this version that appeared on the album and single.

Although the song and recording was a favourite of Badfinger's shortly after it was completed, the hierarchy at Apple reportedly was not inclined to release it in any format. It was not until Al Steckler, the American director of Apple in New York, heard the tape in August 1970 and considered it a strong entry by the band, that it was remixed by engineer/producer Geoff Emerick and slotted for the upcoming LP and as a single release.

The song is also noted for its false ending, after the final chorus, where, after a short pause, the last line is repeated twice before the final ending chord.

Release
In the United States (October 12, 1970), Canada, The Philippines and a few other countries  the single was released with the Tom Evans–Pete Ham song "Carry On Till Tomorrow", the theme song for the movie The Magic Christian, as the B-side.  This was an edited version of the recording that appeared on Badfinger's previous album, Magic Christian Music. In all other countries, the single was backed with the Tom Evans–Joey Molland song "Better Days", which also appeared on No Dice.

Reception
It was the band's first UK Top 10 single to be composed by Badfinger, reaching  number 5 in the UK in January 1971. In the US it peaked at number 8 on the Billboard Hot 100. In South Africa it topped the charts. The band also scored with "Come and Get It", number 4 in the UK in January 1970, which was composed by Paul McCartney, and "Day After Day", number 10 in the UK in January 1972.

Cash Box described the song as sounding "as though it might have come from a '65 Beatles LP" with "bright vocals and strong instrumentals."

The song is notable for being one of the first successful records associated with the power pop sound, using all of the elements attributed to the genre. A subsequent single released by Badfinger, "Baby Blue" (Billboard number 14, 1972), along with several album tracks in a similar vein, succeeded in categorizing the band themselves as power pop. This song is ranked number 1 on VH1's "20 Essential Power Pop Tracks That Will Be Stuck In Your Head Forever".

Personnel

Badfinger version
 Pete Ham – lead vocals, rhythm guitar
 Joey Molland – lead guitar, backing vocals
 Tom Evans – bass, backing vocals
 Mike Gibbins – drums

Def Leppard version
 Joe Elliott – lead vocals
 Phil Collen – guitar, backing vocals
 Vivian Campbell – guitar, backing vocals
 Rick Savage – bass, backing vocals
 Rick Allen – drums

Chart performance

Weekly charts

Year-end charts

References

External links
 

1970 songs
1970 singles
2005 singles
Apple Records singles
Mercury Records singles
Badfinger songs
Def Leppard songs
Songs written by Pete Ham
Number-one singles in South Africa